John Archibald Muirhead (25 July 1876 – 22 April 1958) was an Australian rules footballer who played for the Fitzroy Football Club and St Kilda Football Club in the Victorian Football League (VFL).

Sources
Holmesby, Russell & Main, Jim (2009). The Encyclopedia of AFL Footballers. 8th ed. Melbourne: Bas Publishing.

 

Australian rules footballers from Melbourne
Fitzroy Football Club players
St Kilda Football Club players
1876 births
1958 deaths
People from Campbellfield, Victoria